Gymnosoma hemisphaericum is a  species of fly in the family Tachinidae.

Distribution
France

References

Phasiinae
Diptera of Europe
Insects described in 1785
Taxa named by Étienne Louis Geoffroy